Ashoka Law College is a private law school situated at Manke Talab, Lakhanpur, Kathua in the Indian union territory of Jammu and Kashmir. It offers undergraduate 3 years law courses, 5 Year Integrated LL.B. courses, approved by Bar Council of India (BCI), New Delhi and affiliated to University of Jammu.

History
In the year of 2004, the Ashoka Educational Trust Training and Research Institute established the Ashoka Law College at Kathua.

References

Educational institutions established in 2004
2004 establishments in Jammu and Kashmir
Law schools in Jammu and Kashmir